Karine Schuler (born 29 November 1968) is a former synchronized swimmer from France.

References 

1968 births
Living people
French synchronized swimmers
Olympic synchronized swimmers of France
Synchronized swimmers at the 1988 Summer Olympics
Synchronized swimmers at the 1992 Summer Olympics
Synchronized swimmers at the 1991 World Aquatics Championships